The Beer Can Museum, located in East Taunton, Massachusetts, is a collection of more than 5,000 different beer cans, along with beer can folk art and crafts, beer can clothing, beer can telephones and radios, and a beer can and breweriana related library. In November 2013, it was included in Travel & Leisure's list of 'America's Strangest Museums.'

Contents

Cans dating back to the mid-1930s are on display, as are beer can oddities, test cans, TV and movie props, and obsolete and current trends in beer packaging (e.g. antique cone tops and the newly released alumabottles). The collection is private, but tours can sometimes be arranged by appointment.

The collection was started in 1978 by the museum's director and curator, Kevin Logan. The museum hosts an annual "Museumfest" in the summer, where recent contributors are treated to a barbecue, museum tours, and an awards ceremony.

The oldest can in the collection is a Krueger Ale can from the 1930s which is similar to the first beer can ever produced in 1935. On display as well are older cone tops (such as a Brockert Ale "J-Spout" can from Worcester, Massachusetts and a Star Banner Ale cone top from Boston) and obsolete "flat top" cans from the early days of beer can production. The museum is enhanced by a significant collection of breweriana (beer related collectibles) such as hanging pub towels in the rafters, thousands of coasters or "beer mats", beer trays, and a bar displaying both colorful cans and beer glasses from around the world. Crocheted beer can hats from the 1970s, beer can transistor radios, and a beer can telephone are also on display, as are miniature beer cans used in dollhouses. A unique 'pysanka' (painted Ukrainian style 'Heineken' egg) is also housed at the museum.

See also

 List of food and beverage museums

References

External links
 
 The Brewery Collectibles Club of America (formerly Beer Can Collectors of America)
 Krueger Beer and Ale 
 Clipper Pale at Rusty Cans
 Llanelli Community Heritage Felinfoel Brewery and the first British beer cans

Museums established in 1978
Beer museums
Museums in Bristol County, Massachusetts